The Paris School of International Affairs (PSIA) is a graduate school of Sciences Po (also referred to as the Institut d'études politiques de Paris) based in Paris, France, and it is generally considered to be one of the top rated and most prestigious graduate schools for international relations in the world. Located in the Saint-Germain-des-Prés neighborhood in the 7th arrondissement of Paris, the school has an international student population of 70%, with 1200 students coming from nearly 100 countries.

Taught primarily in English and optionally in French, PSIA offers traditional two-year Master's degrees in international affairs that amount to 90 ECTS credits. Additionally it hosts a number of international dual degree programs with the School of International and Public Affairs at Columbia University, the London School of Economics, the Free University of Berlin, Bocconi University in Milan, the Moscow State Institute of International Relations, Peking University, the Stockholm School of Economics and the University of St. Gallen in Switzerland.

History
The Paris School of International Affairs was established in 2010 in the context of the previous Sciences Po Director Richard Descoings' reforms to expand and internationalize Sciences Po and to diversify its student body. These reforms were effectively seen by the international media as a bold move away from the traditional grandes écoles French university system. As many Masters programs have been transformed into entire schools within Sciences Po, PSIA replaced Sciences Po's former master d'Affaires internationales. PSIA's original precursor is the section internationale (international section) created as early as 1872 by the Ecole libre des sciences politiques (Free school of political sciences) and which welcomed more than 30% of foreign students.

In January 2010 Ghassan Salamé was appointed the first dean of PSIA. In September of the same year, the school had a first intake of 500 graduate students. Within one year, international applications doubled and PSIA now has an enrollment of 1300 students from over 100 countries.

On April 20th, 2015 it was announced that Enrico Letta, former Prime Minister of Italy, would succeed Ghassan Salamé as Dean starting in September 2015.  

On 18 February 2022 it was announced that Arancha Gonzalez, former Minister of Foreign Affairs of Spain, would become Dean of PSIA starting 1 March 2022. She becomes the first woman to hold this position.

"PSIA graduates are trained to be the most competent decision-makers, as well as engaged world citizens who think reflexively, who interconnect issues and articulate ethical dimensions," Ghassan Salamé, Dean of PSIA

Noteworthy faculty and visiting professors
Among PSIA's scholars, practitioners, and leaders in international affairs, are:

 Rony Brauman, former President of Médecins Sans Frontières. He is currently Director of Research at the Doctors Without Borders Foundation and also an associate professor at Sciences Po.
 Paul Collier, director of the International Growth Centre and director of the Centre for the Study of African Economies at the University of Oxford and former director of the Development Research Group of the World Bank
 Lakhdar Brahimi, former UN envoy and advisor
 Sir Howard Davies, British economist, former Director of the London School of Economics and Political Science.
 Olivier de Schutter, UN Special Rapporteur on the Right to Food
 Mamadou Diouf, Leitman Professor of African Studies at Columbia University, specialist in urban, political, social, and intellectual history of colonial and postcolonial Africa
 Fawaz Gerges, network news analyst, and also Professor of Middle Eastern Politics and International Relations
 Ian Goldin, Director of the Oxford Martin School and former Vice President at the World Bank
 Bruno Latour, Sciences Po Professor of Sociology and Anthropology, 2013 Holberg Prize and Centennial Professor at the London School of Economics and Political Science
 Juli Minoves-Triquell, Andorran diplomat and author.
 Miguel Angel Moratinos, Foreign Minister of Spain and previously the EU Special Representative for the Middle East Peace Process, as well as formerly the Ambassador of Spain to Israel
 David Rieff, policy analyst, senior fellow at the World Policy Institute at the New School for Social Research
 Ghassan Salamé, Dean of PSIA, former Senior Advisor to the United Nations Secretary-General (2003–2006) and Political Advisor to the UN Mission in Iraq (2003)
 Hubert Védrine, Diplomatic adviser of François Mitterrand, and former Minister of Foreign Affairs

References

External links
 Sciences Po: PSIA website

Education in Paris
Schools of international relations